Dong-A University Hospital (동아대학교의료원) is a major general hospital affiliated with Dong-A University in Busan, South Korea.

The hospital is situated in the Seo-gu area of Busan, within 20 minutes of Dong-A University's Seunghak and Bumin campuses. The land which it covers is at the foot of Mt. Gudeok and Daeshin Citizens' Park, and is shared between the College of Social Sciences, College of Arts, College of Medicine, School of Mass Communication and Graduate School of Social Welfare. The campus also contains the Dong-A University Museum building.

In December 2010, a groundbreaking ceremony was held for the construction of a new main building that will house the Regional Clinical Trial Center, ER and a Heart-Brain Center. The new building covers 8.7 square kilometers and has an estimated budget of 28.2 billion Korean Won.

Overview
Total Licensed Beds: 992
Outpatients: Approximately 2,800/day
Staff: Approximately 1,700
Land Area: 81,286m2

Founding purposes

Grounded on both the founding ideas of Dong-A University and the policies of Korean medical education, DAUH's aims are to produce qualified medical personnel to serve for the improved health and welfare of the regional community and the nation. The following points were identified as operating criteria:
To focus on clinical and medical research as an educational hospital and enhance creative medical development
Clinical education of medical students into specialists
Supply of quality medical services to meet the medical demands of regional residents and practice humanitarianism
Consistent professional development training for medical staff

Research and study
Dong-A University Hospital specializes in heart and brain research. A new 'Heart-Brain Center' is under construction and due for completion in June 2012.

Other areas of research at the Center include: Gastroenterology, Cardiology, Pulmonology, Allergy, Endocrinology, Nephrology, Hemato-oncology, Hepato-oncology, Infection, Rheumatology, Orthopedics, General Surgery, Plastic Surgery, Thoracic Surgery, Neurosurgery, Obstetrics & Gynecology, ENT, Family Medicine, Rehabilitation Medicine, Pediatrics, Anesthesiology, Dermatology, Neurology, Psychiatry, Diagnostics, Pathology, Radiology, Radiological Oncology, Ophthalmology, Urology, Nuclear Medicine.

Medical equipment
Dong-A University Hospital is equipped with medical equipment, funded through regular government and industry grants.
Da Vinci Robotic Surgery
Novalis
PET CT
MRI
CT
RITA
Gamma Camera
LINAC

Regional clinical trial center
The Dong-A University Regional Clinical Trial Center performs clinical research services for the academic and private sectors. The Center completed 105 investigator-initiated and 96 sponsor-initiated trials in 2010. An MOU was recently signed between this trial center and the clinical trial unit at Asan Medical Center in Seoul. The center is also actively participating in nationwide collaborative research with other prominent Korean institutions.

The CTC's director is Dr Moo-Hyun Kim, a cardiologist.

Specialist divisions
In fulfilling its role as a hub for medical specialists, Dong-A University Hospital is home to various centers of expertise, including: the Robotic Surgery Center, General Health Promotion Center, Stroke Center, Cancer Center, Breast Center, Parkinson's Disease Center, Spine Center, Transfusion-free Medicine & Surgery Center, Cardiovascular Center, Gastroenterology Center, Novalis Radiosurgery Center, Organ Transplant Center, Emergency Medical Center, Clinical Test Research Center, Mental Health Center, and the Sunflower Children's Center.

Robotic Surgery Center
  
The Da Vinci Surgical system is a surgical operating system approved by the US Food and Drug Administration in 2002. In April 2004, a robotic-assisted radical prostatectomy was first performed successfully in a Korean patient with localized prostate cancer by the urology team at the Robotic Surgery Center of Dong-A University Hospital in Singapore. Currently, more than 20 Da Vinci Robots are presently in Korea for the application of various surgical procedures. The system provides dexterous surgical precision with 10-15X magnified 3D images and improves the rate of successful delicate surgical movements when compared with skilled human hands.
Other advantages of the Da Vinci System include:
Shortened hospitalization periods
Decreased pain
Earlier recovery and return to social life
Minimal surgical scars and a subsequent reduction in the risk of infection
Significantly decreased blood loss resulting in reduced transfusion requirements

Current indications for robotic cancer surgery
Prostatectomy: prostatic cancer
Nephrectomy: renal cancer
Cystectomy: bladder cancer
Pyeloplasty: ureteral stricture
Gastrectomy: stomach cancer
Thyroidectomy: thyroid cancer
Esophagectomy: esophageal cancer
Lobectomy of lung: lung cancer
Hysterectomy: uterine cancer

Regional cardiocerebrovascular center
Dong-A University Hospital is a major location for cardiovascular and cerebrovascular care in Busan-Gyeongnam region.

Cancer center
Quality treatment is provided in DAUH's cancer-specialization center in cooperation with the departments of hemato-oncology, plastic and reconstructive surgery, radiology, radiation oncology and general surgery. The Breast Center focuses on early diagnosis of breast cancer, surgical intervention and breast reconstructive surgery.

Parkinson's Disease Center
The Parkinson's Disease Center is a full service diagnostic center for Parkinson's disease. The center offers comprehensive approaches for diagnostic, surgical and rehabilitative services for patients with Parkinson's disease and parkinsonism. Detailed diagnostic procedures can determine origins as an occupational disease, the presence of accompanying dementia, and the need for the surgical intervention.

Spine center

Transfusion-free Medicine & Surgery Center

Gastroenterology Center
Operated by the division of digestive diseases, this center is divided into a stomach-esophagus clinic, colon-anus clinic, liver clinic and pancreas-bile clinic. Centered on the departments of gastroenterology and general surgery, the center also provides follow-up counseling after treatment.

Novalis Radiosurgery Center
Novalis is a modern surgical device for non-invasive treatment of cancerous tissue. Also accessible to the departments of neurosurgery and radiation oncology, it is primarily used for brain tumors, spine tumors and malignant transformations.

Sunflower Women & Children's Center
The Sunflower Women & Children's Center is an outreach effort to protect children from sexual violence. The center also offers diagnosis and counseling by specialists from obstetrics & gynecology, psychiatry and clinical psychology as well as provides advisory lawyers.

Location
Dong-A University Hospital is located in Seo-gu.

References

Hospitals established in 1990
Hospital buildings completed in 1990
Universities and colleges in Busan
Teaching hospitals in South Korea
Hospitals in Busan